Events during the year 1199 in Ireland.

Incumbent
Lord: John

Events
 6 April – on the death of his brother, Richard I of England, Prince John, Lord of Ireland, becomes King of England, thus bringing Ireland under the direct rule of the English Crown.
 6 July – Archbishop Malachy (died 1148) is canonized by Pope Clement III.
 Limerick is granted a charter as a city.
 Risteárd de Tiúit occupies the motte-and-bailey castle in Granard (Granard Motte) as part of an initiative to extend Hiberno-Norman control over the country.
  Milo le Bret, having been granted lands in Rathfarnham, adapted an existing ridge to build a motte and bailey

Births

Deaths

References